Koloman Bedeković (13 October 1818 – 10 August 1889) was a Croatian politician, who served as Minister without portfolio of Croatian Affairs twice: between 1868 and 1871 and between 1876 and 1889. He had a significant role in the creation of Croatian-Hungarian Agreement. In 1871 he was appointed Ban of Croatia-Slavonia.

Bedeković was the leader of the Croatian Unionist Party and fought against his country's independence. As ban he called parliamentary elections in 1871. The People's Party emerged victorious, causing Bedeković to prorogue the Croatian Parliament three times to prevent it from taking power. Dissatisfaction with the obstruction of parliament led to the Rakovica Revolt. Early elections were subsequently called for 1872. The failure of Bedeković to convene the previous parliament resulted in his removal from the post of ban and replacement with the first non-noble ban, Ivan Mažuranić.

References
 Magyar Életrajzi Lexikon

1818 births
1889 deaths
People from Jalžabet
19th-century Croatian people
19th-century Hungarian people
Bans of Croatia
Ministers of Croatian Affairs of Hungary
Croatian Austro-Hungarians